Anneliese Küppers (6 August 1929 – 24 September 2010) was a German equestrian. She was born in Duisburg. She competed in equestrian at the 1956 Summer Olympics in Stockholm, where she won a silver medal in the team competition in mixed dressage (along with Hannelore Weygand and Liselott Linsenhoff).

References

1929 births
2010 deaths
Sportspeople from Duisburg
German female equestrians
Equestrians at the 1956 Summer Olympics
Olympic equestrians of the United Team of Germany
Medalists at the 1956 Summer Olympics
Olympic silver medalists for the United Team of Germany
Olympic medalists in equestrian
20th-century German women